Casemiro do Amaral (14 September 1892  – 18 October 1939) was a Brazilian footballer of Portuguese descent that played as a goalkeeper.

Although he was born in Lisbon, he emigrated to Brazil and his career started in 1911, at America, from Rio de Janeiro, before moving to Germânia, from São Paulo in 1912. Casemiro also played for Mackenzie from 1915 to 1917 and for Corinthians between 1913 and 1914, and from 1918 to 1920.

Casemiro played six times for Brazil, he was also included in Brazil's Copa América squads in 1916 and 1917.

Honours

Corinthians
Campeonato Paulista: 1914

References

1892 births
1939 deaths
Footballers from Lisbon
Portuguese footballers
Portuguese emigrants to Brazil
Brazilian footballers
Brazil international footballers
America Football Club (RJ) players
Sport Club Corinthians Paulista players
Association football goalkeepers